Rackhams was a British department store that opened in Birmingham, England in 1881. The business became part of the Harrods group in 1955, before Harrods was purchased by House of Fraser in 1959. As part of the Harrods grouping in House of Fraser, during the 1970s the Rackhams name was selected to be used as the Midlands and parts of the North of England brand name and several stores were added to its portfolio. In 2000 the Rackhams name was retired and replaced by House of Fraser except for the Skipton and Altrincham stores.

History
In 1851 a new retail drapery business was opened by a partnership formed by William Riddell and Henry Wilkinson at 78 Bull Street, Birmingham, which by 1863 had expanded to a wholesale business based in Temple Row. During 1861 two apprentices joined the company, John Rackham and William Matthews who by 1878 had become buyers for the company. In 1881 the retail store was transferred into Rackham and Matthews ownership and became Rackham & Co.

The business was acquired in 1890 by a trader called Charles Richards. In 1898 Richards expanded the business into the North Western Arcade and within two years had added a Dressmaking department. During 1907 Richards daughter, Hettie married Frank Matthews, the son of former owner William Matthews and one of his workforce, and Matthews was made manager.

The business was incorporated, along with Richards other business, Beehive a discount clothing warehouse, into Charles Richards Ltd in 1913, with Richards and his two daughters owning a third share. In 1914 the frontage on Bull Street was rebuilt and the store had expanded into Temple Row, as well as the Windsor and North Western Arcade. During 1921 Frank Matthew was replaced as manager by Richards nephew, Charles Phillips. Under his management the store was vastly expanded in Temple Row.

In 1927 Maurice Clutterbuck took charge of the business, but it was struggling due to the economic climate and the store was made available for sale, though no bids were accepted during the 1930s. The business took a big hit during World War II when bombs destroyed a third of the store in 1940.

The business however recovered and in 1955 was purchased by Harrods to add to their other stores, and purchased a site for a new store building which work started on in 1957. However, before the store could be completed, House of Fraser completed the purchase of Harrods and did a phased opening of the new store between 1960 and 1966.

During the 1970s, Harrods group were selected to be the constitute grouping for Midlands House of Fraser stores, with the Rackham name being chosen to be the branding. The stores re-branded to Rackhams were:

 Brown Muff were a chain of department stores purchased by House of Fraser in 1977. The stores that were transferred were Altrincham, Bradford, Skipton (formerly Amblers), Bingley (formerly Pratts), and Doncaster . They were rebranded in 1978.
 Burgis & Colbourne Leamington Spa - formerly part of Army & Navy group which House of Fraser purchased in 1973.  The store was rebranded in 1976.
 Thomas Clarkson & Son Wolverhampton - formerly part of Army & Navy group which House of Fraser purchased in 1973.  The store was rebranded in 1976.
Joseph Della Porta Shrewsbury - formerly part of Hide & Co department store chain, purchased by House of Fraser in 1975.
 Morgan Squire Leicester - formerly part of Bournemouth-based chain J J Allen, which House of Fraser purchased in 1969. In 1972, JJ Allen was split into the Dingles and Harrods group with Rackhams gaining Morgan Squire.
 John Walsh Sheffield - purchased by House of Fraser in 1959, the store was rebranded during the 1970s to Rackhams.

In 1982 Rackhams Birmingham store became the first to be refurbished under the new plans of House of Fraser. The ground floor completed between 1984 & 85 was expanded at the cost of £6 million. However the Sheffield store was rebranded in 1987 under the House of Fraser brand, and by 2000 all stores were rebranded under House of Fraser or had been closed.

In popular culture

To the rear of the Birmingham store was a red light district. As a result, going to the 'Back of Rackhams' became a euphemistic phrase used locally for any involvement in prostitution.

The song Big Store by The Devils is set in Birmingham's Rackhams.

See also
Rackhams' stabbing incident, a 1994 Birmingham mass stabbing

References

Defunct retail companies of the United Kingdom
Defunct department stores of the United Kingdom
Harrods
House of Fraser
Retail companies established in 1881